The 1988 Minnesota Golden Gophers football team represented the University of Minnesota in the 1988 NCAA Division I-A football season. In their third year under head coach John Gutekunst, the Golden Gophers compiled a 2–7–2 record and were outscored by their opponents by a combined total of 246 to 195. The tie against Illinois was the last tie for the Golden Gophers and under current NCAA rules, it will be the last in Golden Gophers history.

Punter Brent Herbel was named All-Big Ten second team.  Punter Brent Herbel and offensive lineman Brent Liimatta were named Academic All-Big Ten.

Wide receiver Chris Gaiters was awarded the Bronko Nagurski Award and the Bruce Smith Award. Gaiters was selected as a 3rd team All-American.  Strong safety Joel Brown was awarded the Carl Eller Award.  Brent Herbel was awarded the Bobby Bell Award.  Defensive tackle Ross Ukkelberg was awarded the Butch Nash Award.  Center Pat Hart was awarded the Paul Giel Award.

Total attendance for the season was 312,596, which averaged out to 44,657 per game.  The season high for attendance was against rival Iowa.

Schedule

Roster
WR Jason Bruce
CB Chuck McCree
C Brian Williams

References

Minnesota
Minnesota Golden Gophers football seasons
Minnesota Golden Gophers football